Mainstreet Research is a Canadian market research and polling firm with headquarters in Toronto, and offices in Montreal and Ottawa. The company was founded in 2010 by Quito Maggi, who currently serves as its president.

Mainstreet Research conducts regular Canadian national, regional, and municipal public polling and private market & public opinion research. Their data is reported by various media organizations. In a comparison of polling results with election results, Mainstreet was ranked fourth in Canada by polling analyst Philippe J. Fournier.

Polling 
Mainstreet Research published its first poll on December 9, 2013. Since then Mainstreet Research (formerly Mainstreet Technologies) has published hundreds of polls across dozens of elections and in between elections on matters of public policy. A summary of the elections covered by Mainstreet can be found below.

Controversies
The polling firm drew criticism in 2017 for incorrectly calling that year's Calgary mayoral election in polls conducted for Postmedia. The polls suggested that incumbent Naheed Nenshi was trailing to Bill Smith, a political newcomer, while other pollsters had Nenshi in the lead. A report commissioned after the election by the Market Research and Intelligence Association (MRIA) found that there were flaws in the company's polling methods, one of which resulted in the exclusion of cellphones in polling calls. This led to sampling bias, as younger people tended to have cellphones, but not landlines. It was found that the pollster's attempts to conduct ward-by-ward polling was based on phone numbers linked to postal codes, while cellphones with no such linkage were often dropped. Mainstreet Research president Quito Maggi later admitted to "big, big polling failures", and stated that while the company has implemented recommendations from the report, it would have to work to earn back public trust.

A similar problem was also reported in the company's polls for the 2019 Nanaimo provincial by-election, which mispredicted a win for the BC Liberals over the incumbent BC NDP. Christopher Adams, one of the authors of the report, recommended that such small sample polling be halted until a solution to the sampling problem was found, adding that Mainstreet had done well with larger samples such as with provincial or federal elections.

References

Market research companies of Canada
Public opinion research companies
Companies based in Toronto